Karen Patricia Moe Humphreys (born January 22, 1953), née Karen Patricia Moe, is an American former competition swimmer, Olympic gold medalist, and former world record-holder.  At the 1972 Summer Olympics in Munich, Germany, she won the gold medal in the women's 200-meter butterfly event.

Moe set world records in the 200-meter butterfly in 1970, 1971 and 1972 (twice).  She was inducted into the International Swimming Hall of Fame as an "Honor Swimmer" in 1992.

In 1978, Moe became the head coach of the California Golden Bears women's swim team at the University of California, Berkeley, and served in that position until 1992.  In 1987, she was named the NCAA Division I Women's Swimming Coach of the Year.  From 1992 to 2004, she served within Cal's athletic department.

See also
 List of members of the International Swimming Hall of Fame
 List of Olympic medalists in swimming (women)
 List of University of California, Los Angeles people
 World record progression 200 metres butterfly

References

1953 births
Living people
American female butterfly swimmers
World record setters in swimming
Olympic gold medalists for the United States in swimming
Swimmers at the 1972 Summer Olympics
Swimmers at the 1976 Summer Olympics
UCLA Bruins women's swimmers
Medalists at the 1972 Summer Olympics